Khiali Chehlan Wali (also spelled as Khiali Chahlan Wali or Khiali Chehlanwali) is a village in Mansa district of Punjab. It is predominated by the Jatt people of Chahal clan.

Geography 

It is located at only 3 km from Jhunir. Kaur Wala and Dane Wala, Chachohar and Akkan Wali are the nearby villages.

Demographics

Religion 

The predominators, Chahals, are Sikhs and follows Sikhism. The village has a Gurdwara as the main religious site. Its new building is almost complete.

References 

Villages in Mansa district, India